José Luis Tamayo Terán (29 July 1858 – 7 July 1947) was President of Ecuador from 1 September 1920 to 31 August 1924.
He was a member of the Ecuadorian Radical Liberal Party. He was Presidents of the Chamber of Deputies in 1898, and President of the Senate in 1905. He was the last Ecuadoran President to complete a full term in office until Galo Plaza Lasso did so nearly a quarter-century later.

Among Tamayo's actions in office was to promulgate Ecuador's first regulations regarding the oil industry, although the law had little practical effect.  He was also active in establishing vice taxes in order to fund programs to arrest the spread of venereal disease among the prostitutes of Quito.

References

JOSE LUIS TAMAYO TERAN. diccionariobiograficoecuador.com

1858 births
1947 deaths
People from Santa Elena Province
Ecuadorian people of Spanish descent
Ecuadorian Radical Liberal Party politicians
Presidents of Ecuador
Presidents of the Senate of Ecuador
Presidents of the Chamber of Deputies of Ecuador
Knights Grand Cross of the Order of Isabella the Catholic